Silvia Morgan (1923–2009) was a Spanish film actress.

Selected filmography
 Gentleman Thief (1946)
 When the Angels Sleep (1947)
 Under the Skies of the Asturias (1951)
 Forbidden Trade (1952)
 Persecution in Madrid (1952)
 Bella the Savage (1953)
 What Madness! (1953)
 An Impossible Crime (1954)
 An American in Toledo (1960)
 The Two Rivals (1960)

References

Bibliography 
 Moore, Robin. Nationalizing Blackness: Afrocubanismo and Artistic Revolution in Havana, 1920-1940. University of Pittsburgh Press, 2015.

External links 
 

1923 births
2009 deaths
Film actresses from Catalonia
Spanish film actresses
People from Barcelona
Spanish expatriates in the United States